Cline is a surname. It is an anglicisation of the German name Klein. Notable people with the surname include:

Alan Cline, American computer scientist
Aleisha Cline (born 1970), Canadian skier
Alex Cline (born 1956), American drummer
Alfred Leonard Cline (1888–1948), American serial killer
Alice C. Parker, née Cline, American electrical engineer
Amy F. Cline (born 1974), American judge
Ben Cline (born 1972), American politician
Bill Cline (born 1943), American football player
Bob Cline (1933–2020), American politician
Bruce Cline (born 1931), Canadian ice hockey player
Cass A. Cline (1850–1926), American pioneer
Catherine Ann Cline (1927–2005), American historian and author
Charles Cline (disambiguation), multiple people
Chris Cline (1958–2019), American businessman
Curly Ray Cline (1923–1997), American fiddler
Cyrus Cline (1856–1923), American politician
David Cline (activist) (1947–2007), American veterans activist
David B. Cline (1933–2015), American physicist
Donald Cline, American fertility specialist, biological father of at least 96 people
Edward Cline (born 1946), American screenwriter and director
Edward F. Cline (1891–1961), American screenwriter
Emma Cline, American writer
Eric Cline (born 1955), Canadian politician
Eric H. Cline (born 1960), American archaeologist
Ernest Cline (born 1972), American comedian and screenwriter
Ezra Cline (1907–1984), American bassist
Genevieve R. Cline (1877–1959), American judge
Gloria Griffen Cline (1923–1973), American historian
Henry Cline (1750–1827), English surgeon
Hernán Cline (born 1973), Uruguayan cyclist
Hollis Cline, American neuroscientist
Howard F. Cline (1915-1971), American historian 
Isaac Cline (1861–1955), American meteorologist
Jackie Cline (born 1960), American football player
James J. Cline (1899–1969), American football coach
Judy Wills Cline (born 1948), American trampoline gymnast
Kameron Cline (born 1998), American football player
Keita Cline (born 1974), Virgin Island athlete
Leonard Cline (1893–1929), American novelist
Leticia Cline (born 1978), American model
Madelyn Cline (born 1997), American actress
Maggie Cline (1857–1923), Irish-American singer
Mark Cline (born 1961), American artist
Martin Cline (born 1934), American geneticist
Melanie Cline (born 1975), American motocross racer
Melissa S. Cline, American biologist
Milton W. Cline (1825–1911), American sailor
Monk Cline (1858–1916), American baseball player
Nels Cline (born 1956), American guitarist and composer
Ollie Cline (1925–2001), American football player
Patsy Cline (disambiguation), multiple people
Ray S. Cline (1918–1996), American intelligence officer
Russ Cline, American lacrosse executive
Russell Cline (born 1965), American currency trader
Sperry Cline (1881–1964), Canadian policeman
Sue Cline (1946-2021), American politician
Terry Cline (born 1958), American psychologist
T. J. Cline (born 1994), American-Israeli basketball player
Tony Cline (1948–2018), American football player
Tony Cline Jr. (born 1971), American football player
Troy Cline (born 1969), American stock car racing driver
Ty Cline (born 1939), American baseball player
Victor Cline (1925–2013), American psychoanalyst
William R. Cline (born 1941), American economist

See also 
Clyne (surname), people with the surname "Clyne"
Kline (surname), people with the surname "Kline"
Klein (surname), people with the surname "Klein"